Abbas may refer to:

People 
 Abbas (name), list of people with the name, including:
Abbas ibn Ali, Popularly known as Hazrat-e-Abbas (brother of Imam Hussayn)
Abbas ibn Abd al-Muttalib, uncle of Muhammad
 Mahmoud Abbas (born 1935), Palestinian president
 Abbas (actor) (born 1975), Indian actor
 Abbas the Great (1571–1629), Fifth Safavid Shah of Iran

Places

Algeria
 Kingdom of Ait Abbas
 Kalâa of Ait Abbas

Azerbaijan
 Abbas, Azerbaijan

Iraq
 Al Abbas Mosque, shrine of Abbas ibn Ali in Karbala

Iran

Khuzestan Province
 Abbas, Ahvaz
 Abbas, Behbahan

Lorestan Province
 Abbas, Dowreh
 Abbas Barfi
 Abbas-e Kalpat

United Kingdom
In English place-names the affix "Abbas" denotes former ownership by an abbey.
 Abbas Combe, Somerset
 Abbas Hall, Suffolk
 Bradford Abbas, Dorset
 Cerne Abbas, Dorset
 Compton Abbas, Dorset
 Itchen Abbas, Hampshire
 Melbury Abbas, Dorset
 Milton Abbas, Dorset
 Winterbourne Abbas, Dorset

See also
 Abba (disambiguation)
 Ab (Semitic)
 Darreh-ye Abbas (disambiguation) (meaning "Abbas Valley")